Don Bosco Senior Secondary School is a school located in Guwahati, Assam. It is a Catholic school founded on the teachings of Saint John Bosco, and is run by the Salesians of Don Bosco.
Started in 1948, Don Bosco is one of the leading private schools in the North-Eastern states. It currently operates 12 standards, divided into primary, middle, senior and senior secondary sections. The school is managed by a Principal, with Vice Principals and Teacher-Coordinators operating under him. The school currently houses 3000 students.

History

Predecessor
Our Lady’s Orphanage, a school for boys of the Assam plains was the predecessor of the current high school. It inaugurated on 24 May 1926, by Rt. Rev. Mgr. Mathias S.C.D.D., Prefect Apostolic of Assam. At the time, a residence and a workshop were constructed. The technical school began in 1928 with 12 students.  It then exponentially grew into two large workshops with 200 students by 1938. The name Our Lady’s Orphanage was then changed to Don Bosco Technical School, Guwahati. In 1937, the school operated classes I to IV. During the Second World War, it was taken over by the army in June 1942 and the school was closed.

Current school

In February 1948, at an inaugural ceremony presided over by Dr. Bhubaneswar Barua, the school was formally restarted with an enrollment of 92 students in five classes from III to VII. Mr. Har Mohan Das was the headmaster and the first principal was Rev. Fr. Attilio Colussi.

The opening of Class VIII was approved by the director of public instruction in February 1948. The school was affiliated to Gauhati University in 1951 and its candidates were permitted to appear for matriculation in the year 1952, when 9 out of 12 students of the Tenth Standard appeared and eight succeeded. Mr. Nirmal Kumar Choudhury, former Vice Chancellor of Gauhati University, was one of them. Parts of the school buildings were used by Assam Civil Engineering School prior to 1948 and by Gauhati University in 1948. Public demand in 1958 led to the beginning of the English section from Class VIII with required permission from the University. Class IV, V and VI in the English section started in 1962.

In 1980 the pre-primary and primary sections were opened. With the addition of pre-primary and primary sections, the school rapidly grew in size and status. It was the first school in the North-East to have computer education (which began in 1987), an auditorium and sports complex (1993), and a meteorological observatory center (2002). As the 20th century drew to a close, Don Bosco had formed a prominent foothold among the education institutes of the North-East.

The most dramatic changes in the school were seen at the start of the 21st century. Under the leadership of the then headmaster Fr. Joseph M. Thelekkatt, the school management drew up plans for an extension block – known as the Centenary Block – to commemorate 100 years (1906–2006) of Don Bosco Society's services in India. The new block comprised both an Academic Section composed of more classrooms and a sports and culture section.

Academically, the primary school curriculum and teaching methods were revamped. The teachers of the primary school underwent several workshops to familiarize them with child centered and activity oriented teaching methods. Further the school sought and obtained affiliation under the central Board of Secondary Education. Since 2006 the school is affiliated to the CBSE board. The first batch of students is scheduled to appear for the Central Board examinations in 2009.The first batch of Kindergarten appeared in 2010. The teachers have also been trained to use multimedia teaching aids. The school has created a resource centre in view of providing the campus with WiFi. The school administration software "Campuscare" has automated the school offices, Library and school administration.

Coeducation
Don Bosco School was originally an all-boys school, but has started to move towards coeducation. The senior secondary section already admits both boys and girls. The first batch of female students in the youngest grades of Kindergarten and Class I were admitted in 2010 and Don Bosco is a co-ed school now.

Milestones
1922–1953
 1922 – Arrival of the Salesian Missionaries. Establishment of Don Bosco Centre in Guwahati. First Salesian Priest to work in Guwahati – Fr. Gill (from Spain).
 1925 – First Rector of Don Bosco School, Guwahati – Fr. Piasescki (Poland).
 1926 – Opening of our Lady's Orphanage by Fr. Piasescki (Rector) and Msgr. Mathias (Provincial).
 1928 – Don Bosco Technical School opened in Guwahati.
 1947 – Don Bosco College Hostel started by Fr.Uget, Provincial and Fr. Colussi, Rector.
 1948 – Opening of Don Bosco School, Guwahati.
 1952 – First Batch of students to write matric examinations under Guwahati University.
 1953 – First issue of school magazine "The Bosconian" was out.

1954–1987
 1954 – Introduction of house system.
 1964 – First batch of students to write HSLC exams under SEBA.
 1968 – Don Bosco Technical School shifted to Don Bosco Maligaon.
 1978 – Interact Club takes initiatives to bring Mother Teresa to Guwahati and established the first concert.
 1980 – Opening of Pre-primary and Primary Classes.
 1987 – Introduction of computers in the School.

1988–2002
 1988 – The Celebration of Don Bosco's Birth Centenary by the Salesian family under the leadership of Don Bosco Guwahati. All India Don Bosco Table Tennis Championship and Centenary of Don Bosco organised.
 1989 – First issue of school newsletter "Bosconews" published.
 1990 – The Blessing of the newly constructed St. Joseph's Church.
 1993 – Inauguration of the new Don Bosco Auditorium cum Sports Complex.
 1995 – The diocese of Guwahati became an Archdiocese.
 2002 – Construction of the covered gallery and the Bro. Ignatius Pavilion.
 2002 – Girl students admitted into the Evening school. Adult literacy and Skills training centre opened, for women.
 2002 – Inauguration of the Office of the DB Past Pupils, Guwahati Unit.

2003–2005
 2004 – Renovation and air-conditioning of Don Bosco library.
 2004 – Inauguration of Don Bosco Annex.
 2004 – Commencement of "Live-in Exposure Camps" for Primary and middle school classes.
 2004 – Inauguration of Vechi and Vigano computer labs.
 2004 – Abolishing of examination and tests for primary classes and the introduction of continuous evaluation for the primary school.
 2005 – Introduction of Digital classroom and multi-media teaching aids.

2006
 2006 – Construction of the Art Gallery.
 2006 – Don Bosco Rongali Bihu Utsav organised for the first time.
 2006 – Affiliation of the school to Central Board of Secondary Education (CBSE).
 2006 – Foundation Laying ceremony for the Centenary Block.

2008
 2008 – Blessing of the Academic Wing of the Centenary Block.
 2008 – Abolishing of textbooks for classes I-III.
 2008 – Last batch for HSLC examinations under Secondary Education Board of Assam (SEBA).
 2008 – Inauguration of Jeevan Sarathi Counselling services.
 2008 – Inauguration of Diamond Jubilee Park and monument of Gandhiji.
 2008 – Installation of wall murals of the four patrons of the house system.
 2008 – Foundation laying ceremony of the Diamond Jubilee Wing for disaster management.

2009–present
 2009 – First batch for Board exams under Central Board of Secondary Education (CBSE).
 2009 – Don Bosco upgraded to Senior Secondary.
 2009 – Admission of girl students to class XI.
 2010 – Admission of girl students to Kindergarten and Class I.
 2020 - First batch of girl students for Class X Board exams.

Rectors 
 Fr. Attilio Colussi [1948 – 1949]
 Fr. Arneodo  [1949 – 1953]
 Fr. E. Zanon  [1953 – 1957]
 Fr. Del Col [1957 – 1960]
 Fr. Melino  [1960 – 1967]
 Fr. Patrick Burns [1967 – 1973]
 Fr. T.T. Thomas [1973 – 1979]
 Fr. P.J. Thomas [1979 – 1985]
 Fr. V.M. Thomas [1985 – 1989]
 Fr. C.T. Lukose [1989 – 1992]
 Fr. K.O. Augustine [1992 – 1995]
 Fr. C. Kuriala [1995 – 2001]
 Fr. J.M. Thelekkatt [2001—2012]
 Fr. Antony Thekkel [2012–2015]
 Fr. Sebastian Mathew [2015–present]

Headmasters 
 Mr. Harmohan Das 1948–1953
 Fr. Patrick Burns 1953–1968
 Fr. Thomas Vattoth 1968–1971
 Fr. K.S.Paul 1971–1973
 Fr. T.T.Thomas 1973–1979
 Fr. J.Thelekkatt 1979–1980
 Fr. V.J.Sebastian 1980–1982
 Fr. V.M.Thomas 1982–1990
 Fr. M.C.George 1990–1993
 Fr. Mathew Vellankal 1993–1995
 Fr. C.Kuriala 1995–2001

Principals 
 Fr. J. M. Thelekkatt 2001–2012
 Fr. Antony Thekkel 2012–2015
 Fr. Sebastian Mathew 2015–present

House System

Bezbarua House
Patron: Lakshminath Bezbarua 
Colour: Yellow  
Motto: No Pain, No Gain

Marshalls
Senior/Senior Secondary: Mr. Abonti Kumar Bordoloi
Middle:                  Mrs. Munmi Mazumdar
Primary:                 Mrs. Manisha Barua

Bordoloi House
Patron: Nabin Chandra Bordoloi 
Colour: Green  
Motto: Character Is True Wealth

Marshalls
Senior/Senior Secondary: Mrs. Sangita  Chakraborty
Middle:                  Mrs. Sagarika Singh
Primary:                 Mrs. Mamoni Das

Lachit House
Patron: Lachit Borphukan 
Colour: Red  
Motto: Service To Humanity

Marshalls
Senior/Senior Secondary: Mr. Abonti Kumar Bordoloi
Middle:           Mrs. Savita George 
Primary:          Mrs. Leena Das

Phukan House
Patron: Tarun Ram Phukan 
Colour: Blue  
Motto: Nobility Of Character

Marshalls
Senior/Senior Secondary: Mrs. Sharmistha Das
Middle:                  .....
Primary:                 Mr. Basil Maraya

External links 
 Official website
 http://www.salesians.org/salesians.html
 http://donboscoindia.com/english/defaultbosco.php

Schools in Guwahati
Christian schools in Assam
Educational institutions established in 1948
1948 establishments in India